Alan Gordon Corbett (born 6 April 1954) is a former Australian politician. Originally a teacher, he was the founder of A Better Future for Our Children, a New South Wales political party. In 1995, he was elected to the New South Wales Legislative Council for that party despite receiving only 1.24% of the vote. He served until his retirement in 2003. Corbett has one son. The party did not contest the state election of that year. His wife died in 2017 at the age of 51 after suffering from a long illness.

References

1954 births
Living people
Members of the New South Wales Legislative Council
21st-century Australian politicians